KBEL (1240 AM) is a radio station broadcasting a news talk format. Licensed to Idabel, Oklahoma, United States, the station is currently owned by Dave Smulyan, through licensee KBEL Communications, LLC. and features programming from SRN Salem Radio Network, Premiere Networks, Citadel Broadcasting, Genesis Communications, Talk Radio Network, Radio America and several others.

History
KBEL-AM was launched January 1, 1952 and was the first radio station in McCurtain County, Oklahoma.

On June 22, 1999, the station's license, along with that of its sister station KBEL-FM, was assigned by Harold E. Cochran to Box Broadcasting.

The licenses of both KBEL and KBEL-FM were assigned by Box Broadcasting to Rod Liechti's Brute Force Radio, LLC. The transaction was consummated on July 30, 2013 for no consideration. Brute Force Radio sold the stations to Dave Smulyan's KBEL Communications, LLC effective October 9, 2018 for $230,000.

References

External links

BEL (AM)
News and talk radio stations in the United States
Radio stations established in 1952